The 2017 IIHF Challenge Cup of Asia was the 10th edition of the IIHF Challenge Cup of Asia, an annual international ice hockey tournament held by the International Ice Hockey Federation (IIHF). It took place from 17 to 23 March 2017 at the ice skating rink of the CentralPlaza Grand Rama IX shopping mall in Bangkok, Thailand. Five nations participated, though a sixth, Kyrgyzstan, was supposed to but cancelled. the United Arab Emirates won the tournament, their third time doing so.

Top Division

Standings

Schedules
(UTC+07:00)

Awards and statistics

Awards

Best players selected by the directorate:
 Best Goaltender:  Khaled Al Suwaidi
 Best Defenceman:  Boldbayar Bayajikh
 Best Forward:  Juma Al Dhaheri
Source: IIHF.com

Scoring leaders

Source: IIHF.com

Goaltending leaders
Only the top five goaltenders, based on save percentage, who have played at least 40% of their team's minutes, are included in this list.

Source: IIHF.com

Division I

The Division I competition was played between 22 and 25 April 2017 in Kuwait City, Kuwait.

Standings

References

External links
STATISTICS
STATISTICS (Div I)

IIHF Challenge Cup of Asia
IIHF Challenge Cup of Asia
IIHF Challenge Cup of Asia
IIHF Challenge Cups of Asia